John Ernest II (11 September 1627, in Weimar – 15 May 1683, in Weimar), was a duke of Saxe-Weimar. He was the second but eldest surviving son of William, Duke of Saxe-Weimar, and Eleonore Dorothea of Anhalt-Dessau.

Life 
After the death of his father on 1662, he became reigning duke. In 1672 John Ernest divided his possessions with his younger brothers. He retained Weimar, his brother John George I received Eisenach, and his other brother, Bernhard, received Jena. Eventually, the partitioned lands, Saxe-Weimar, Saxe-Eisenach (1741) and Saxe-Jena (1690) were re-combined.

Like his father, John Ernest was particularly interested in the arts (see Fruitbearing Society). He was also an avid hunter. Given his overriding interest in these pursuits, John Ernest entrusted the reigns of government to his chancellor.

In Weimar on 14 August 1656, John Ernest married Christine Elisabeth, (23 June 1638 – 7 June 1679), a daughter of John Christian, Duke of Schleswig-Holstein-Sonderburg (26 April 1607 – 28 June 1653).
They had five children:
Anna Dorothea (b. Weimar, 12 November 1657 - d. Quedlinburg, 23 June 1704), Abbess of Quedlinburg (1685–1704).
Wilhelmine Christine (b. Weimar, 26 January 1658 - d. Sondershausen, 30 June 1712), married on 25 September 1684 to Christian William of Schwarzburg-Sondershausen.
Eleonore Sophie (b. Weimar, 22 March 1660 - d. Lauchstädt, 4 February 1687), married on 9 July 1684 to Philipp of Saxe-Merseburg-Lauchstädt.
William Ernest, Duke of Saxe-Weimar (b. Weimar, 19 October 1662 - d. Weimar, 26 August 1728).
John Ernest III, Duke of Saxe-Weimar (b. Weimar, 22 June 1664 - d. Weimar, 10 May 1707).

Ancestors

References

Bibliography 
 Ernst Wülcker: Johann Ernst, Herzog von Sachsen-Weimar. In: Allgemeine Deutsche Biographie (ADB). Band 14, Duncker & Humblot, Leipzig 1881, S. 360–362.
 Karl Helmrich: Geschichte des Grossherzogthums Sachsen-Weimar-Eisenach, Weimar 1852, S. 102 (Digitalisat)

|-

1627 births
1683 deaths
House of Wettin
Nobility from Weimar
Dukes of Saxe-Weimar